Pharaoh Overlord #1 is the debut album by Finnish experimental rock band Pharaoh Overlord. It was released on CD in 2000 by Ektro Records.

The album features three members of krautrock-influenced rock band Circle indulging their love for stoner rock. All the tracks are instrumental and follow a basic model of hugely distorted, repetitive riffs. Although Pharaoh Overlord were to move away from this sound in subsequent albums, it remains the cornerstone of their live performances; the song Mangrove appears on both Pharaoh Overlord's live albums, The Battle Of The Axehammer (Live) and Live In Suomi Finland.

Track listing

 Slow City (9:54)
 Mangrove (9:12)
 Mystery Shopper (10:23)
 Transatlantic (7:11)
 Alcohol (Blue Flame) (8:13)
 Landslide Non Stop (9:50)

Personnel

Jussi Lehtisalo
Tomi Leppänen
Janne Westerlund

References

Pharaoh Overlord albums
2000 albums